This article describes the group stage of the 2013–14 EHF Women's Champions League.

Format
The 16 teams were split into four groups, consisting of four teams. Each team played a home and away game against all opponents in the group. The first two ranked teams advance to the main round where the same format was used to determine the final four participants.

Group matches

Seedings
The draw of the group matches was held on 28 July in Vienna. A total of sixteen teams were concerned in the process, to be divided into four pots of four. Teams are divided into four pots, based on EHF coefficients. Clubs from the same pot or the same association could not be drawn into the same group.

Group A

Group B

Group C

Group D

Main round
The draw of the group matches was held on 19 November at the Gartenhotel Altmannsdorf in Vienna. A total of eight teams were concerned in the process, to be divided into two pots of four. Teams were divided into two pots, based on EHF coefficients. Clubs from the same pot or group could not be drawn into the same group.

Seedings

Group 1

Group 2

References

External links
Official website

2013–14 Women's EHF Champions League